Hopewell is a settlement in Clarendon Parish, Jamaica.

References

Populated places in Clarendon Parish, Jamaica